Charles Morse Hazen (March 13, 1866 – April 22, 1952) was an American football coach.  He was the second head football coach at the University of Richmond, serving for four seasons between 1882 and 1888 and compiling a record of 4–4. He was described in an 1889 publication as "virtually the father of physical culture at Richmond College."

Hazen died at a nursing home in 1952.

Head coaching record

References

External links
 

1866 births
1952 deaths
19th-century players of American football
Player-coaches
Richmond Spiders football coaches
Richmond Spiders football players
People from Prattville, Alabama